Coe Booth is an American fiction writer. Her first novel, Tyrell, released in 2006, is written for young adolescents.

Biography
Booth was born on March 21 in New York City.  She grew up in the Bronx.

Booth graduated from college in 1996 with a BA and MA in psychology and worked as a social worker in New York City Emergency Children's Service.  In 2005, she attended The New School for General Studies in New York, where she completed a Master of Fine Arts program in creative writing. Also in 2005, Booth completed her first novel, Tyrell.  Her inspiration to write this book came from her experiences working with the troubled teenagers in New York.

Booth is a full-time writer and part-time college professor at a Bronx Community College, teaching English.  She also volunteers for the NAACP ACT-SO program, where she mentors teenage writers.  She lives in Basel, Switzerland as a writer-in-residence at Laurenz Haus.

Publications

Books
Tyrell, 2006 
Kendra, 2008
Bronxwood, 2011
Kinda Like Brothers, 2014

Tyrell Series
Tyrell, 2006
Bronxwood, 2011

Short stories
Contributed a short story in the anthology This is Push: New Voices from The Edge

Awards
The 2007 Los Angeles Times Book Prize for Young Adult Fiction
The 2007 New York Public Library's Books for the Teen Age
The 2007 American Library Association (ALA) Best Books for Young Adults
The 2007 ALA Quick Picks for reluctant Young Adult Readers
The 2015 ALA Notable Books for Children

References

Works cited
Scholastic.com Retrieved on 2008-04-22.
The Brown Bookshelf .  Retrieved on 2008-04-22.
The Alan Review .  Retrieved on 2008-04-23.

External links
Official website

Living people
Year of birth missing (living people)
21st-century American writers
21st-century American women writers
Writers from New York City
Bronx Community College faculty